Bernard Michael Miller (3 May 1915 – 19 April 1960) was an Australian rules footballer who played for the Geelong Football Club in the Victorian Football League (VFL).

Notes

External links 

Australian rules footballers from New South Wales
Geelong Football Club players
1915 births
1960 deaths